Regina Riot are Regina's first and only women's tackle football team in the Western Women's Canadian Football League competing in the Prairie Conference. The team, and the league just ended their seventh season. Their provincial rivals are the Saskatoon Valkyries. 

The team's current head coach is Kris Hadesbeck and the general manager is Alicia Dorwart. The Riot play their games at Mosaic Stadium.

Year by year

IFAF competitors
The following recognizes athlete and staff from the Regina Riot that competed in the IFAF Women's World Football Championships

2013
Ciara Bray
Claire Dore
Olivier Eddie (coach)
Emma Hicks
Aimee Kowalski
Mallory Starkey
Becky Wallis
Adrienne Zuck

2017
Carmen Agar
Emilie Belanger
Claire Dore
Olivier Eddie (coach)
Katie Hungle
Artemis Kouropoulou
Aimee Kowalski
Alex Kowalski
Ashley Viklund
Adrienne Zuck

References

Canadian football
Sport in Western Canada
Women's sports in Canada
Canadian football teams in Saskatchewan
Sport in Regina, Saskatchewan
2010 establishments in Saskatchewan
Sports clubs established in 2010
Women in Saskatchewan